St. Patrick Church is a Catholic church located at 212 Meredith Street in Kennett Square, Pennsylvania. Named in honor of Saint Patrick, it is part of the Roman Catholic Archdiocese of Philadelphia. It was founded December 1869.

History 
Kennett Square area Catholics attended Mass at St. Joseph's on the Brandywine in Delaware up until the mid-1800s. The Diocese of Wilmington was formed in the late 1860s, leaving Kennett Square area Catholics without a church within their own diocese.

Father John Wall, a missionary from Saint Thomas the Apostle Church in Delaware County collected funding and erected the original St. Patrick Church on South State Street. It was the first Catholic parish in southern Chester County. The first Mass was celebrated on Christmas Day of 1869. and on September 1, 1872, Archbishop Wood dedicated the church. The building was in use for over 35 years, eventually replaced by the present building on Meredith Street which was consecrated in 1907.

Interior

Stained glass windows 
The stained glass windows of St. Patrick were imported from Munich, Germany. They number five on either side of the building with a triple-window facing Meredith Street. The subjects of the windows were chosen by Father John H. O'Donel and are as follows:
 The Christ Child in the carpenter shop of his foster father
 The symbols of the Four Evangelists, two on either side of the main entrance: St. Matthew with an angel, St. Mark with a lion, St. Luke with an ox, and St. John with an eagle.
 St. Joseph holding lilies
 St. Patrick
 St. Margaret, Queen of Scotland
 St. Agnes
 The Blessed Virgin

Pews 
The pews of St. Patrick are constructed of solid red oak. It is estimated that to duplicate a single pew today would cost thousands of dollars.

School 
St. Patrick School was the parochial school of the St. Patrick parish. Formed in 1922, the original school was staffed by the Sisters of St. Joseph. Later, the school taught grades 1 through 8 and offered kindergarten and preschool programs as well. The school closed in 2012, part of a massive reorganization effort in the archdiocese.

References

External links 
 Saint Patrick Church

Roman Catholic churches in Pennsylvania
Religious organizations established in 1869
1869 establishments in Pennsylvania
Churches in Chester County, Pennsylvania
Kennett Square, Pennsylvania